The Suspect is a British police procedural television series in five episodes based on Michael Robotham's 2004 novel The Suspect. Screenwritten by Peter Berry and produced by Natasha Romaniuk, the first episode aired on ITV on Monday 29 August 2022.

The thriller stars Aidan Turner  in the title role of  Joe O'Loughlin, a clinical psychologist.  The series was filmed during 2021 in various locations in London.

Synopsis
A woman is found in a shallow grave in a cemetery. The postmortem reveals that she has been stabbed 21 times, self inflicted. Asked by the police for his advice on the crime, Joe O'Loughlin a clinical psychologist, reveals that the woman was a former patient and following a series of apparent coincidences and circumstantial evidence he becomes suspected of the murder.

Cast
Aidan Turner as Joe O'Loughlin
Shaun Parkes as DI Ruiz
Anjli Mohindra as DS Devi
Sian Clifford as Fenwick
Camilla Beeput as Julianne 
Adam James as Gerald Owens
Bobby Schofield as Bobby Moran
Bronagh Waugh as Cara
Angela Griffin as Melinda
Katy Carmichael as Bridget Aherne

Episodes

Critical response
A review of the TV series in  The Independent states "The dialogue is far too flimsy to effectively gloss over anything; plot holes fall out the characters’ mouths with a clang" but does admit to it being 'strangely compelling'.

References

External links

2022 British television series debuts
2020s British crime drama television series
2020s British police procedural television series
Television series by World Productions
Television series by ITV Studios
English-language television shows